Mana Yamamoto (born 22 March 1997) is a Japanese female handball player for HC Nagoya and the Japanese national team.

She represented Japan at the 2021 World Women's Handball Championship in Spain.

References

1997 births
Living people
Japanese female handball players